Midnight Movies: From the Margin to the Mainstream is a 2005 documentary film written and directed by Stuart Samuels, based on his book on the subject.

Summary
The film chronicles the period between 1970 and 1977 in which six low-budget films shown at midnight transformed the way films are made and watched: El Topo (1970), Night of the Living Dead (1968), The Harder They Come (1973), Pink Flamingos (1972), The Rocky Horror Picture Show (1975), and Eraserhead (1977).

Also portrayed in the film are the films Freaks (1932) and Reefer Madness (1936), which gained notoriety and a huge cult following thanks to midnight showings. Providing interviews are filmmakers George A. Romero, Alejandro Jodorowsky, John Waters, Perry Henzell, David Lynch, and Richard O'Brien, as well as film critics Roger Ebert, Jonathan Rosenbaum, and J. Hoberman and Ben Barenholtz.

Release
The film was screened out of competition at the 2005 Cannes Film Festival.

Reception 
On Rotten Tomatoes, the film has an aggregate score of 91% based on 10 positive and 1 negative critic reviews.

See also
American Grindhouse-2010 documentary similar in content
Art film
Cult film

References

External links

MUBI
Grindhouse Cinema Database

2005 films
Documentary films about the cinema of the United States
English-language Canadian films
American documentary films
Canadian documentary films
2005 documentary films
Cult following
2000s English-language films
2000s American films
2000s Canadian films